Gimme! Coffee is a coffee roaster and third-wave coffee shop, based in New York, with espresso bars in Ithaca and Trumansburg. In response to the COVID-19 pandemic, Gimme! announced the permanent closure of the Manhattan and Brooklyn based locations and also began an Ithaca-area delivery service. Gimme! Coffee also has a wholesale service that caters to coffee and espresso establishments. In January 2020, Colleen Anunu replaced founder Kevin Cuddeback as CEO after he served 20 years in the role.

Relationships
A focus at Gimme is to form relationships with farmers who grow coffee. As part of this bond between consumer and producer, the farmer may receive a price premium, which in turn, can help them improve their operations. For example, since 2009, Gimme has worked with a farmer in Colombia, helping the producer to attain organic certification and win awards.

The director of coffee at Gimme is working with Boyce Thompson Institute to map the arabica coffee genome to improve taste and make arabica beans less susceptible to disease.

Awards
In 2006, the New York Times named Gimme! Coffee among the best espresso bars in New York City. Gimme! Coffee received a Good Food Award, in the coffee category, for 2011 and 2012. Roast magazine chose Gimme! Coffee as winner of their 2013 Roaster of the Year contest (macro category). Dark Forest Chocolate collaborated with Gimme! Coffee to make an espresso based chocolate bar that won a Good Food Award in 2019.

Unionization 
In May 2017, the upstate New York Gimme employees formed a union through the Tompkins County Workers' Center. In February 2018, the group ratified its first union contract. It is the first known baristas union with an aim at paying workers a living wage, ensuring the workers are not fired without just cause, and guaranteeing an excellent work environment.

College Partners
In August 2014, Gimme! opened an espresso bar in Gates Hall on Cornell University main campus.

Subsequently, in 2017 an agreement was reached with Ithaca College to begin serving Gimme Coffee on campus.

See also
 List of coffeehouse chains

References

Further reading
 "Courtyard Café is abuzz with a new brew" by Franklin Crawford, Cornell Chronicle, March 2005
 "Masters of the Bean" by Brendan Vaughan, Chow, September 2005
 "New Roastery Eases Growing Pains" by Katherine Graham, The Ithaca Journal, August 16, 2006
 "Best U.S. Coffee Bars" by Nick Pandolfi, Food & Wine, September 2008

External links
 

Coffeehouses and cafés in the United States
Restaurants in New York (state)
Companies based in New York (state)
Restaurants established in 2000
2000 establishments in New York (state)